Lobsang Tengye Geshe  དགེ་བཤེས་བློ་བཟང་བསྟན་རྒྱས་ （31 december 1927 in Lhatse, Tibet - 25 october 2019 in Toulouse, France) Tibetan lama scholar, monk since the age of six, graduated Geshe Lharampa (the highest level doctorate in Buddhist philosophy in the Geluk School) at the famous Sera Je Monastery in Tibet.

In France for over thirty years, it applies tirelessly to transmit the benefits of various teachings of the Buddha Shakyamuni, he taught for many years in Buddhist Temple Linh Son of Joinville-le-Pont and for years at the Vajra yogini Institut in the Tarn where he currently resides.

Publications
 Suede having Great Wisdom monitoring Turtle and Wild Geese, 1991, 
 The Wheel of Life, 1993, 
 On the Mahāyāna's Ocean, 1993, 
 The Yoga Guru of Tsong Khapa Lama, 1994, 
 Lands and paths, 1997, 
 The Wheel with sharp blades, 1998, 
 Collection of teachings, Four lessons: how to abandon the four attachments, reincarnation, eight stanzas of the transformation of thought, the penetrating view. Editions Vajra Yogini (September 3, 1999)
 Commentary to the practice of Nyoung ne (བསྙུང་གནས། fasting), 2009,

Links
https://web.archive.org/web/20131012043733/http://www.vajra-yogini.com/shopevy/index.php?main_page=index&cPath=106_19&sort=20a&page=2&zenid=g5b5o39pmgmpl35skih1b7jpu0

Lamas from Tibet